Curtis Alexander Nelson (born 21 May 1993) is an English professional footballer who plays as a centre back for Championship side Blackpool. 

He has also played in the English Football League for Plymouth Argyle, Oxford United and Cardiff City. Nelson made his debut in the Football League in 2010. He was capped by England at under-18 level.

Early and personal life
Nelson was born in Newcastle-under-Lyme, Staffordshire. He is a cousin of sprinters Ashleigh and Alexander Nelson and his younger brother Wes appeared in series 4 of the reality TV show Love Island in 2018.

Career

Plymouth Argyle
Nelson spent seven years with Stoke City as a schoolboy before being released in February 2009. He joined Plymouth Argyle two months later. His performances in the 2009–10 season for the youth team and reserves, in both defence and midfield, earned him a place in the first-team squad for the club's final match of the campaign against Peterborough United. Nelson trained with the first team during throughout their 2010–11 pre-season and impressed manager Peter Reid. "I was very impressed with young Curtis," said Reid. "I like young players and he will be training with us all the time now. He played centre-back last year but he can play midfield as well." He made his first-team debut on 10 August 2010 in the League Cup against Notts County, replacing Anton Peterlin as a second-half substitute.

He signed his first professional contract in October 2010, one that would last until the end of the 2011–12 season. His performances for Argyle led to a call-up to the England under-18 team to play Italy in April 2011. He replaced George Moncur in the second half as England drew 1–1. Nelson appeared in 35 league matches during his debut season and three more in cup competitions. He finished the season by winning the club's Young Player of the Year award. Nelson began the new season in the team, but lost his place in November after the club signed Maxime Blanchard and Darren Purse. A knee injury in December meant a lengthy spell on the sidelines and new manager Carl Fletcher stressed that it was important Nelson took as long as he needed to make a full recovery.

Nelson signed a new undisclosed contract in April 2012, along with teammates Luke Young and Jared Sims. Nelson finished the season with 21 appearances in all competitions. He scored his first senior goal in a win against Northampton Town in September. "I ran over to the fans to celebrate, but I didn't know what to do," said Nelson. In April 2013, he became the youngest Plymouth Argyle captain since Norman Piper in August 1967 when he led the team in a win against Cheltenham Town. "It was a great honour. To be the captain at such a young age, I wasn't expecting it at all." Nelson made 32 appearances in the 2012–13 campaign and scored three goals. On 7 May 2014, Nelson committed to the Pilgrims by signing a new two-year contract with the club.

Oxford United
On 4 July 2016, Nelson signed for newly promoted League One club Oxford United on a two-year contract, later extended by a year. An independent transfer tribunal was required as Nelson was an academy graduate aged under 24 and the two clubs were unable to agree a fee. The tribunal ruled a fee of £200,000 was payable with an additional £80,000 depending on appearances. Before the start of his second season at the club, following the departure of John Lundstram, he was appointed team captain. He suffered a ruptured Achilles tendon during a home defeat to Northampton Town in November 2017 and was ruled out for the remainder of the season, teammate John Mousinho replacing him as captain. Nelson returned, earlier than expected, to the first team as a substitute on 14 April 2018  was immediately handed the captain's armband, though Mousinho later took the armband permanently. Nelson declined a contract renewal and left Oxford after the 2018–19 season, having appeared 121 times in all competitions, scoring 8 times, in his three seasons with the club.

Cardiff City
Nelson signed for newly relegated Championship club Cardiff City on 27 June 2019 on a free transfer on a two-year contract. He made his debut as a substitute in place of Marlon Pack during a 3–0 defeat to Reading. He scored his first goal for Cardiff on 2 November 2019 in a 4–2 win against Birmingham City.

Nelson signed a two-year extension on his contract on 7 September 2020, keeping him in the Welsh capital till 2023.

Blackpool
On 28 January 2023, Nelson signed for Championship side Blackpool on a deal until the end of the season after leaving Cardiff by mutual consent.

Career statistics

Honours
Oxford United
EFL Trophy runner-up: 2016–17

Individual
PFA Team of the Year: 2015–16 League Two

References

External links
Profile at the Cardiff City F.C. website

1993 births
Living people
Sportspeople from Newcastle-under-Lyme
English footballers
England youth international footballers
Association football defenders
Stoke City F.C. players
Plymouth Argyle F.C. players
Oxford United F.C. players
Cardiff City F.C. players
Blackpool F.C. players
English Football League players